Phreesia, Inc. is a software as a service company that offers healthcare organizations a set of applications to automate and manage patient intake.

Headquartered in Wilmington, Delaware, Phreesia employs approximately 1400 people across the United States and Canada. Phreesia was founded in January 2005 by CEO Chaim Indig and COO Evan Roberts. Michael Weintraub has remained chairman of the company's board since its founding.

On July 18, 2019, Phreesia (PHR) completed its initial public offering and is listed on the New York Stock Exchange (NYSE). 

In 2021, Phreesia acquired schedule-management solution QueueDr, now offered to Phreesia clients as Appointment Accelerator. In December 2021, it also announced the acquisition of Insignia Health, licensor of the Patient Activation Measure.

References

Healthcare software companies
Software companies based in New York City
Software companies established in 2005
2005 establishments in New York City
2019 initial public offerings
Companies listed on the New York Stock Exchange
Software companies of the United States
2005 establishments in the United States
Companies established in 2005